Samoa is a genus of harvestmen. It consists of three species:
 Samoa obscura  — Upolu, Samoa; Viti Levu Fiji
 Samoa sechellana  — Mahé and Praslin, Seychelles
 Samoa variabilis  — Upolu, Samoa

References

Harvestman genera
Fauna of Samoa